The 2016 Major League Soccer All-Star Game, the 21st annual Major League Soccer All-Star Game, took place on July 28, 2016 (7:30 p.m. EDT, 4:30 p.m. local time) at Avaya Stadium, the home of the San Jose Earthquakes. The game was televised live on ESPN and Univision in the United States, and on TSN and RDS in Canada.  The game featured the MLS All-Star team playing English side Arsenal, with the match being a preseason friendly for Arsenal as part of their tour of California.

Chuba Akpom was named MVP.

Squads

MLS All-Stars
The MLS All Star Fan XI was announced on July 9, 2016, however members of this XI were not guaranteed a slot in the 22 man game day squad.

Notes:
Injured or otherwise unable to play.

Arsenal
On July 22 Arsenal announced a 25-man traveling squad for the MLS All-Star game:

Notes:
Injured or otherwise unable to play.
Development Squad

Match

References

2016
All-Star Game
2016 in sports in California
Arsenal F.C. matches
Sports competitions in San Jose, California
Soccer in California
July 2016 sports events in the United States
21st century in San Jose, California